Paid is Blood is a 1971 Spaghetti Western directed by Luigi Batzella.

The original Italian title of the film was Quelle Sporche Anime Dannate.

Plot
Tom Carter's brother is robbed and murdered and robbed after withdrawing all his money out of the bank to wed Cora, a saloon girl. Cora helps Tom unmask the real killer, a sinister town boss trying to swindle a prospector's family out of their farm.  Showdowns and heroism ensue.

References

External links

1971 films
Spaghetti Western films
1970s Italian films